Chiriţeşti may refer to several villages in Romania:

 Chiriţeşti, a village in Suseni, Argeș
 Chiriţeşti, a village in Uda, Argeș
 Chiriţeşti, a village in Vedea, Argeș 
 Chiriţeşti, a village in Izvoarele, Prahova